Anders Nielsen (30 May 1862 – 13 June 1914) was a Danish farmer, editor, politician, and Minister for Agriculture. He was elected for Venstre, and served as minister from 1908 to 1909 in the governments of both Niels Neergaard and Ludvig Holstein-Ledreborg, and again in the Klaus Berntsen government from 1910 to 1913.

Sources
Minister for Agriculture profile
"Salmonsens konversationsleksikon" (2nd Edition), Volume XVII: Mielck—Nordland, 1924, p.921, "Nielsen, Anders"
Gyldendals Åbne Encyklopædi entry

1862 births
1914 deaths
Agriculture ministers of Denmark
Venstre (Denmark) politicians